Manuila Raobu (born 18 September 2000) is a Tuvaluan Weightlifter who has represented Tuvalu at the Commonwealth Games and Pacific Games.

At the 2016 Oceania Weightlifting Championships he came first in the 56kg youth category. He was part of Tuvalu's team for the 2018 Commonwealth Games on the Gold Coast, where he was Tuvalu's flagbearer at the opening ceremony. He later competed at the 2015 and 2019 Pacific Games.

During the Covid-19 pandemic he was stranded in Samoa. While there he trained with Samoan weightlifters under Tuaopepe Jerry Wallwork.

At the 2022 Pacific Mini Games in Saipan, Northern Mariana Islands he won two gold medals in the 73kg category, as well as a gold in the 2022 Oceania Weightlifting Championships held at the same time.

References

Living people
2000 births
Tuvaluan male weightlifters
Commonwealth Games competitors for Tuvalu